Naksansa or Naksan Temple is a Korean Buddhist temple complex in the Jogye order of Korean Buddhism that stands on the slopes of Naksan Mountain (also called "Obongsan Mountain"). It is located about midway between Sokcho and Yangyang, Gangwon Province, eastern region of South Korea. Naksansa is one of the few temples in Korea to overlook the Sea of Japan.

Naksan is an abbreviated term of Botarakgasan in Korean that refers to Mount Potalaka, the place where the Avalokitesvara Bodhisattva is believed to live. Thus, Naksan Mountain is also known as Korea's Mount Potalaka. The Bodhisattva is said to live on a sea-bound island along with guardian dragons. Naksansa is regarded as one of the great eight scenic areas in the Eastern region of Korea, known as "Gwandong Palgyeong" (관동팔경).

History
Naksansa was founded in 671, by the Buddhist monk, Uisang Daesa (Grand Master Uisang), an ambassador of the 30th King Munmu of the Silla Period (BC 57-AD 935) after he had returned from studying abroad during the Chinese Tang Dynasty, who, while meditating near the cave in which the Avalokitesvara Bodhisattva (Gwaneumbosal) was believed to have lived, was told by the Bodhisattva to build the temple there.

Today, the octagonal Uisangdae Pavilion sits on the spot where Uisang once meditated, the current pavilion having been built in 1925.

Treasures

The white granite statue stands in a clearing at the top of the hill, eyes and fingers closed in peaceful meditation as it gazes out to sea. The massive statue is the work of Busan sculptor Gwon Jeong-hwan (권정환) and was dedicated in 1977. 700 tons of granite and six months were required to complete the sculpture. It is the largest Buddhist statue of its kind in the Orient.

Hongreanam was built by Uisang as a Hermitage above a stone cave. In the sanctuary floor there is a 10-centimeter (4 in) opening through which you can see the sea below.

Naksansa's seven storied stone pagoda, Naksansa Chilcheung Seoktap (Seven storied stone pagoda in Naksansa Temple) built in 1467, the 13th year of the reign of King Sejo, is Treasure No.499. During a repair, it is said that a Buddhist rosary and a magic bead were sealed inside the pagoda. The seven storied stone pagoda is an example of the Goryeo style pagoda having a single square foundation. The square foundation on this pagoda is carved with 24 lotus petals. Of special note is a stone prop in each story, which is larger and thicker than its body stone. The pagoda is formed with thin eaves, a straight slope, and upward edges. On the finial, around the long thin, bronze rod are ornaments similar to those in Lama pagoda of Yuan Dynasty (1279-1368) in China. Mostly it follows the rather simple style of the Goryeo pagodas though.

Temple gallery

2005 fire and reconstruction

Most of Naksansa was destroyed by a fire that started in the surrounding forest on April 5, 2005. The Naksansa bronze bell, a national treasure dated 15th century, was also melted and destroyed in the fire. The museum displays a violin and cello built from wood found on the temple grounds that survived the fire. A replicate of the bell was constructed and installed back to the temple.

The temple was earlier destroyed by fire during the Mongolian invasion of the 13th century. During the Joseon Dynasty (1392-1910) the temple was repeatedly reconstructed and expanded by royal order in 1467, 1469, 1631 and 1643. The pre-2005 fire facilities were constructed in 1953 after the buildings were again destroyed during the 1950-53 Korean War.

Present reconstruction is well under way as can be seen in the gallery below. The new construction projects are expected to be completed and the temple fully restored by 2010.

Reconstruction Gallery

See also
Korean Buddhist temples
Religion in South Korea

References

External links and references
Naksansa official site, in Korean
Naksansa Temple stay, in Korean
Naksansa-The Temple of Compassion
Naksansa burns - a flash presentation
Cultural Properties Administration
 LeBass, Tom. "Insight Guides - South Korea"

15th-century Buddhist temples
Buildings and structures completed in 1926
Religious organizations established in the 7th century
Buddhist temples of the Jogye Order
Buddhist temples in South Korea
Buildings and structures in Gangwon Province, South Korea
Yangyang County
Tourist attractions in Gangwon Province, South Korea